Karahacılı is a village in Mersin Province, Turkey. It is a part of Yenişehir municipality of Mersin. of Mersin Province. The population of the village is 728 as of 2002. Main crops of the village are fruits and vegetables.

References

External links
Images